William McMaith Hastie Miller (9 March 1884 – 2 October 1970) was an Australian rules footballer who played with Geelong in the Victorian Football League (VFL).

Notes

External links 

1884 births
1970 deaths
Australian rules footballers from Melbourne
Geelong Football Club players